Aurora Floyd (1863) is a sensation novel written by the prominent English author Mary Elizabeth Braddon. It forms a sequel to Braddon's highly popular novel Lady Audley's Secret (1862).

Plot
Aurora Floyd is the spoiled, impetuous, but kind hearted daughter of Archibald Floyd, a wealthy banker and his wife, an actress who died shortly after Aurora's birth. At the age of seventeen, Aurora is suddenly sent away from her home, Felden Woods, to a Parisian finishing school, but returns after an absence of fifteen months.  At a ball held in honor of Aurora's nineteenth birthday, she meets thirty-two year old Captain Talbot Bulstrode, the eldest son of a Cornish baron.  While otherwise down-to-earth, Talbot is extremely proud of his family's heritage and is looking for a wife without the slightest blot to her reputation. He believes he may have found this ideal woman in Aurora's cousin Lucy, but he quickly realizes that, while she is pure and innocent, he is not in love with her and begins to fall in love with Aurora, of whom he had originally taken little notice.  When for a walk, Aurora, Talbot and Lucy meet John Mellish, an old school friend of Talbot's.  John falls instantly in love with Aurora and the two men soon realize that they are both rivals for Aurora's affection; although, Aurora has shown little interest in John.  Talbot proposes to Aurora, but she rejects him.  John also proposes and is rejected.  Talbot goes to say goodbye to Archibald, but instead finds Aurora in a faint.  When he revives her, he ends up proposing again and this time they become engaged.  He later finds that prior to having fainted Aurora was reading a newspaper which contained an article about an English jockey named Conyers who had died in a horse-racing accident in Germany.  Talbot eventually learns that soon after arriving at the Parisian finishing school, Aurora ran away and when he questions her about the fifteen months of her life prior to returning to Felden Woods, she refuses to account for her actions and will only tell him that her father knows what happened to her and that it broke his heart.  Unable to bear the shame that this secret will likely bring to his family, Talbot ends his engagement with Aurora even though he is still in love with her. 

Following the end of the engagement, Aurora endures a months-long illness, during which time John stays near the family as he has come to be a favorite of Mr. Floyd's and despite knowing that Aurora doesn't love him, he once again proposes to her.  Aurora tells John the reason Talbot ended their engagement; although, she doesn't disclose the nature of her secret and when John again asks her to be his wife, she accepts his proposal, they are married and Aurora moves to John's home, Mellish Park.  Aurora meets the repulsive Steeve Hargraves, who was once the favorite groomer to John's father.  Twenty years previous, Hargraves suffered a brain injury in a hunting accident and since that time, he has worked at various jobs around the stables although most of the other stable hands are wary of him due to his uneven temper.  Aurora has John fire Hargraves following an incident of cruelty involving Aurora's cherished dog.  When a new trainer is needed at Mellish Park, John gets a recommendation from a friend and Aurora becomes hysterical when she hears that the man's name is James Conyers.  When John questions her as to her reaction, she will only tell him that Conyers once worked for her father and that he knows something of her secret; despite this, she agrees to have him come to Mellish Park. Conyers arrives and takes up residence in a lodge house on the Mellish property.  He hires Hargraves to look after the lodge, fully knowing the resentment Hargraves has for Aurora and tells Hargraves not to worry about Aurora trying to have him removed again.  Suspicious of the connection between Aurora and Conyers, both Mrs. Powell and Hargraves eavesdrop on a private conversation between the two and hear Aurora offer Conyers £2000.  One week after his arrival at Mellish Park, Conyers is found dead in the woods having been shot in the back.  It is revealed that Aurora and Conyers had been married after Aurora ran away from the Parisian school, thus making her marriage to John not legal; although, at the time she had wed John, Aurora had believed that Conyers had died in the horse racing accident in Germany.  Unable to face the man she has grown to love and bring more shame and disgrace to him, Aurora runs away from Mellish Park and goes to Talbot and Lucy (who have been married) in London seeking Talbot's advice.  The next morning Talbot fortuitously runs into John who has stopped in London on his way to see Aurora's father and Talbot reunites the two lovers.  Following Talbot's advice, Aurora and John are legally married as soon as possible and return to Mellish Park only to find that, through Mrs. Powell's machinations, rumors that implicate Aurora in the murder of Conyers have spread around the village and surrounding area.  Eventually, a distance grows between John and Aurora as Aurora believes that the shame she has caused him has made John stop loving her and John; although, still in love with Auroras, has doubts about her innocence.  On the night of John and Aurora's return to Mellish Park, but unknown to her, the murder weapon was found; a pistol of John's that he had been cleaning the morning of the murder along with other guns.  He had stepped out for a moment and returned to find Aurora putting the weapons back in order as she was accustomed to do. Talbot convinces John that anyone could have taken the pistol and John and Aurora are reunited once again.  

A detective from Scotland Yard comes to Mellish Park to investigate and finds clues which point to Hargraves as the murderer, but he is unable to find proof.  Out walking one night by the lodge where Conyers was staying, Talbot sees a dim light inside and goes to investigate.  He finds Hargraves who has returned to the lodge to retrieve the £2000 that he took from Conyers after murdering him.  After a struggle, Hargraves is subdued and, after confessing his crime, is eventually hanged.

Characters 
 Aurora Floyd - black-haired, beautiful daughter of Archibald Floyd and Eliza Floyd (née Prodder)
 Talbot Bulstrode - proud heir to a wealthy Cornish baronetcy and Captain of Her Majesty's 11th Hussars; falls in love with Aurora, but rejects her when he learns of the secret stain on her reputation
 John Mellish - owner of Mellish Park in Yorkshire; a big man of about thirty years old, but with a childish enthusiasm and innocence; he also falls in love with Aurora
 Archibald Martin Floyd - widowed father of Aurora; a wealthy Kentish banker of Scottish descent and owner of Felden Woods; married at the age of forty-seven
 Lucy Floyd - Aurora's first-cousin-once-removed; eldest daughter of Archibald's nephew Alexander; she is Aurora's closest friend and confidante; angelic and well-educated, but rather simple and meek otherwise; she is secretly in love with Talbot
 Mrs. Alexander Floyd - Lucy's mother; she also acts as a mother-figure to Aurora
 Mrs. Walter Powell - widowed governess/chaperone to Aurora and later her housekeeper after Aurora's marriage; spiteful and envious of Aurora
 James Conyers - very handsome, but lazy, selfish and unscrupulous; he is able to play on his good looks to make people think well of him; lame due to a horse racing accident that nearly killed him; he is hired as the new groomer and trainer at the stables of Mellish Park
 Stephen Hargraves - short, fat and ugly; he initially works in the stables at Mellish Park; has a brain injury suffered in a hunting accident years previous 
 Capt. Samuel Prodder - Aurora's maternal-uncle, left England to go sailing when Aurora's mother was still a young girl
 Matthew Harrison - a dog-fancier who attempts to blackmail Aurora with knowledge of her secret
 Joseph Grimstone - a Scotland Yard detective

Publication
Aurora Floyd was first serialized in London's monthly Temple Bar Magazine between January 1862 and January 1863, then published in the latter year in three volumes by William Tinsley.

Dramatisation
In the same year, Aurora Floyd was adapted for the stage by Colin Henry Hazlewood and first performed at the Britannia Theatre Saloon in the Hoxton district just north of the City of London.

The script was subsequently published by Thomas Hailes Lacy as the 85th in his series Acting Edition of Plays. Tinsley also dramatised other works by Braddon, notably Lady Audley's Secret.

References

External links

Aurora Floyd at University of North Carolina (HTML edition)

1863 British novels
British novels adapted into films
Sensation novels
Sequel novels